David Kaplan is an American piano soloist and chamber musician. He is currently on the faculty at the UCLA Herb Alpert School of Music.

Biography 
Born in New York City to musical parents in 1983, David Kaplan is the son of Mark Kaplan, renowned violinist and pedagogue. Following his undergraduate studies at UCLA, he attended Yale School of Music where he studied under Claude Frank. David is also a Fulbright Scholar, and studied conducting with Lutz Köhler at the Universität der Künste in Berlin.

David is a core member of Decoda, the first ever Affiliate Ensemble of Carnegie Hall, a chamber ensemble dedicated to excellence in performance and meaningful engagement with the communities it performs for.

An advocate of contemporary music, "Kaplan’s passion for drawing connections between past and present music has resulted in New Dances of the League of David, a suite that incorporates newly commissioned miniatures into Schumann’s Davidsbündlertänze, Op. 6, including such eminent composers as Augusta Read Thomas, Hannah Lash, Gabriel Kahane, and Andrew Norman."

David is a Yamaha Artist.

Discography 

 No Orpheus the Songs of Mohammed Fairouz with soprano Kiera Duffy (2016) Naxos.
 Shy and Mighty (2010) Timo Andres & David Kaplan, Nonesuch Records.

References

External links 

 David Kaplan, pianist
 David Kaplan, The UCLA Herb Alpert School of Music

American male pianists
1983 births
Living people
UCLA Herb Alpert School of Music faculty